"Where Silence Has Lease" is the second episode of the second season of the American science fiction television series Star Trek: The Next Generation, the 28th episode overall. It was originally released on November 28, 1988 in broadcast syndication. Directed by Winrich Kolbe, it was written by Jack B. Sowards.

Set in the 24th century, the series follows the adventures of the Starfleet crew of the Federation starship Enterprise-D. In this episode, the Enterprise becomes enveloped by a void in space where the crew is tested by a powerful alien presence.

Plot
While on a charting mission, the Federation starship Enterprise, under the command of Captain Jean-Luc Picard, discovers a zone of pure blackness in space; probes launched into the area simply disappear. As they study it further, the zone expands and soon envelops the Enterprise, leaving them in a black void with sensors reporting nothing outside. Picard orders the ship on a return course but they find that they cannot escape; they leave a stationary beacon behind them, only to have it reappear ahead of them.

A Romulan Warbird suddenly decloaks in front of the ship and attacks; Picard orders the crew to return fire, they destroy the Warbird but Picard is suspicious of how easily this occurs. The crew then detect what appears to be their sister ship, the USS Yamato, approaching but it does not respond to hails. Commander Riker and Lt. Worf beam over to search the ship, where they find it empty with various inconsistencies in its construction, including more seemingly impossible physical loops. The Enterprise then detects an exit from the darkness, but cannot lock onto the away team to retrieve them before the opening disappears. The Yamato begins to fade away, but the Enterprise is able to beam Riker and Worf back just in time. More openings appear in the blackness, each closing as soon as the Enterprise approaches them. Picard realizes that they are being manipulated and orders a full stop.

Suddenly, an entity with a distorted, almost childlike face as a result of it attempting to look humanoid, appears in the void, calling itself Nagilum. It announces its curiosity about humans and their "limited existence" and would like to test the limits of the human body. It causes Ensign Haskell to experience violent convulsions and he then falls to the floor dead. Nagilum then states that it wants to know everything about death, asserting absent-mindedly that it would take between a third and a half of the Enterprises crew to complete its experiments. Picard decides to activate the ship's self-destruct sequence rather than to submit to Nagilum's whims. As the crew prepares for their end, Picard is tested again by Nagilum through peculiar behavior displayed by doppelgangers of Counselor Troi and Lt. Commander Data, both of whom question the self-destruct order. After these facsimiles are gone and the countdown nears zero, the void suddenly vanishes, leaving the Enterprise in normal space. Picard orders the ship to move away at high speed and when he is finally satisfied that they are truly free, cancels the self-destruct sequence. As the Enterprise continues on its mission, Picard is met by the face of Nagilum on his ready-room computer. Nagilum offers its evaluation of humanity, criticizing the species's faults and claiming they have nothing in common with its kind. Picard disagrees, pointing out that their recent encounter shows that both species are curious, a logical statement to which Nagilum concedes before disappearing.

Production

 The character of Nagilum was originally named "Nagillum", after actor Richard Mulligan, whom the show's co-executive producer, Maurice Hurley, originally wanted cast in the role.  "Nagillum" is "Mulligan" spelled backward.
 When Picard is approached by the doppelgängers of Troi and Data, he is listening to one of Erik Satie's compositions, Gymnopédie No. 1 (1888).
 The title of the episode is from the last stanza of a 1907 poem, "The Spell of the Yukon" by Robert W. Service.
 When Picard and Riker decide to set the ship on auto-destruct, the computer asks how long until that should happen (they choose 20 minutes), which is a direct contradiction — or development subsequent — to a first season episode (11001001) when the captain and first officer set the auto-destruct, and Riker comments that they have no choice as to the length of time until the ship destroys itself (5 minutes).

Reception
The A.V. Club compared the episode to the original Star Trek "it's back to the God-like beings and technology-indistinguishable-from-magic storytelling" and had mixed feelings about the episode putting a new spin on familiar ideas.
Tor.com rated it 4 out of 10. Den of Geek recommended the episode "Not just because it's a very Star Trek-y episode of Star Trek, but because it’s full of fun character moments and interesting direction."

In 2018, CBR ranked Nagilum as a strong characterization of Star Trek; in particular they note how it deceives yet also causes trouble for the crew of the Enterprise 1701-D. The appearance of the spacecraft USS Yamato was also noted. (The Yamato is the same type as the  Enterprise 1701-D)

In 2020, ScreenRant noted this as a frightening episode of Star Trek, elaborating "... the audience were subjected to psychological stress in this season 2 episode."

References

 Star Trek The Next Generation DVD set, volume 2, disc 1, selection 2.
 Wikisource:The Spell of the Yukon and Other Verses/The Spell of the Yukon

External links

 

Star Trek: The Next Generation (season 2) episodes
1988 American television episodes
Works by Jack B. Sowards